Addison Porter Jones (September 15, 1822 – May 5, 1910) was an American politician from New York.

Life
He was born on September 15, 1822, in Greenville, New York.

He attended the common schools. In 1843, he became a merchant in Catskill.

He entered politics as a Whig and in 1855 became a Democrat. He was Supervisor of the Town of Catskill in 1856, 1860 and 1861; and Sheriff of Greene County from 1862 to 1864.

He was a presidential elector in 1876, voting for Samuel J. Tilden and Thomas A. Hendricks.

Jones was a member of the New York State Senate (14th D.) in 1878, 1879, 1882 and 1883.

He died on May 5, 1910, and was interred in Catskill Village Cemetery.

Legacy
His grandson, Addison Porter Jones II (1877-?) was named after him. He married Annette Whittaker and was the president of the Catskill Savings Bank.

References

Sources
 Civil List and Constitutional History of the Colony and State of New York compiled by Edgar Albert Werner (1884; pg. 291 and 412)
 The State Government for 1879 by Charles G. Shanks (Weed, Parsons & Co, Albany NY, 1879; pg. 57f)
 The Samuel Gompers Papers by Stuart B. Kaufman (1986; pg. 263)

1822 births
1910 deaths
New York (state) state senators
People from Greenville (town), New York
New York (state) Democrats
1876 United States presidential electors
Town supervisors in New York (state)
Sheriffs of Greene County, New York
People from Catskill, New York
New York (state) Whigs
19th-century American politicians